Anthony Roux (born 18 April 1987) is a French former road bicycle racer, who competed as a professional from 2008 to 2022 for UCI WorldTeam .

Major results

2005
 1st  Overall Tour de Lorraine Juniors
2007
 2nd Liège–Bastogne–Liège Espoirs
 3rd Time trial, National Under-23 Road Championships
2008
 2nd Overall Grand Prix du Portugal
 4th Overall Tour du Poitou-Charentes
 5th Overall La Tropicale Amissa Bongo
 10th Trophée des Grimpeurs
2009
 1st Stage 17 Vuelta a España
 1st Stage 4 Circuit de la Sarthe
 2nd Boucles de l'Aulne
 3rd Road race, National Road Championships
 4th GP Ouest–France
 7th Overall Circuit de Lorraine
 10th Overall La Tropicale Amissa Bongo
2010
 1st Stage 5 Circuit de Lorraine
 1st Stage 1 Tour du Poitou-Charentes
 2nd Duo Normand (with Jérémy Roy)
 4th Overall Circuit de la Sarthe
 4th Paris–Camembert
2011
 1st  Overall Circuit de la Sarthe
1st  Young rider classification
1st Stage 4
 1st  Overall Circuit de Lorraine
1st  Points classification
1st Stages 1 & 4
 1st Tour de la Somme
 2nd Road race, National Road Championships
 2nd Duo Normand (with Jérémy Roy)
 8th Overall Tour du Limousin
2012
  Combativity award Stage 2 Tour de France
2013
 Vuelta a Burgos
1st  Points classification
1st Stage 4
 1st  Points classification, Route du Sud
 3rd Overall Étoile de Bessèges
1st Stage 6 (ITT)
 4th Grand Prix d'Ouverture La Marseillaise
 6th Trofeo Laigueglia
2014
 2nd Time trial, National Road Championships
 4th Overall Circuit de la Sarthe
 5th Paris–Camembert
2015
 1st Stage 2a Circuit de la Sarthe
 6th GP Ouest–France
 7th Grand Prix de la Somme
2016
 2nd Time trial, National Road Championships
 3rd Grand Prix Cycliste de Québec
 5th Time trial, UEC European Road Championships
 6th Overall Tour du Poitou-Charentes
 9th Grand Prix Cycliste de Montréal
 10th Overall Tour La Provence
2017
 3rd Time trial, National Road Championships
 7th Clásica de San Sebastián
2018
 National Road Championships
1st  Road race
4th Time trial
 1st Stage 4 Route d'Occitanie
 3rd Overall Tour du Limousin
1st Stage 1
 3rd Clásica de San Sebastián
 10th Grand Prix Cycliste de Québec
2020
 9th Bretagne Classic
 10th Time trial, UEC European Road Championships

Grand Tour general classification results timeline

References

External links

 

1987 births
Living people
People from Verdun
French male cyclists
French Vuelta a España stage winners
Sportspeople from Meuse (department)
Cyclists from Grand Est